The North Dakota Fighting Sioux women's basketball team is part of the athletic program at the University of North Dakota in Grand Forks, North Dakota.  It is a member of the NCAA Division I Summit League; the 2019-2020 season was their first in the new conference. Previously they played in Division I's Big Sky Conference and Division I's Great West Conference.

The first year the university fielded a women's team was in 1894.  Since then, the women's team has appeared in 23 NCAA tournaments.  The first Division I appearance was in 2014.  With the exception of 1986, 1987, and 1989, the basketball team appeared in every NCAA Division II tournament from 1984 to 2007.  Three of the Division II tournament appearances resulted in three consecutive Division II National Championships (1997, 1998, 1999).

Head coaches

Conference Championships
North Central Conference
Regular Season Champion (11 times): 1989-90, 1990–91, 1992–93, 1993,94, 1997–98, 1998–99, 2000–01, 2001–02, 2004–05, 2005–06, 2006–07
Conference tournament champion (7 times): 2001, 2002, 2003, 2004, 2005, 2006, 2007
Great West Conference
Regular Season Champion (2 times): 2009-10, 2011–12
Conference tournament champion (1 time): 2012
Big Sky Conference
Regular Season Champion (2 times): 2013-14, 2016–17
Conference tournament champion: (1 time): 2014

National Championships
1997 (DII)
Defeated Southern Indiana 94-78
1998 (DII)
Defeated Emporia State 92-76
1999 (DII)
Defeated Arkansas Tech 80-63

Postseason

NCAA Division I tournament results
The Fighting Hawks have made one appearance in the NCAA Division I women's basketball tournament. They have a combined record of 0–1.

NCAA Division II tournament results
The Fighting Hawks, then known as the Fighting Sioux, made twenty-two appearances in the NCAA Division II women's basketball tournament. They had a combined record of 36–19.

Arenas
Hyslop Sports Center, 1974–2003
Betty Engelstad Sioux Center, 2004–present

References

External links
 

 
1894 establishments in North Dakota
Basketball teams established in 1894